Mohabbat Zindagi Hai is a 1966 Hindi movie produced by K. C Gulati for Roop Chaya, and directed by Jagdish Nirula. The film stars Dharmendra, Rajshree, Mehmood and Deven Verma. The music was composed by O. P. Nayyar with lyrics by S. H. Bihari.

Cast
Dharmendra as Amar
Rajshree as Neeta Mehta
Mehmood as Manglu
Mehmood Junior as child artist 
Chand Usmani as Laajo
Deven Verma as Advocate Vikram Sinha "Vicky"
Nazir Hussain as Mr. Sinha
Badri Prasad as Mr. Mehta

Music

External links 
 

1966 films
1960s Hindi-language films
Films scored by O. P. Nayyar